Burlington is an agricultural center and town in northwestern Alfalfa County, Oklahoma, United States. The population was 152 at the 2010 census.

History
Originally the town of Burlington was named "Drumm", for prominent cattle rancher Major Andrew Drumm.  Major Drumm had operated the 150,000 acre U Ranch in the area from 1874 until 1888 on land leased from the Cherokees and was a founder of the Cherokee Strip Live Stock Association.  Drumm was also the founder of the Andrew Drumm Institute in Independence Missouri.

Its post office was established under the name Drumm on June 6, 1906.  But when the initial plans in July 1907 to rename the town "Wheaton" fell through, the town's name was officially changed to Burlington on August 21 of that year, which it remains to this day.

A member-owned agricultural cooperative called Burlington Grain Company was formed in 1916.  It currently operates as Burlington Cooperative Association.  The elevator at Burlington has a capacity of 1,774,000 bushels.  A second facility in nearby Amorita has storage space of 342,000 bushels.

Alfalfa County's first consolidated school was organized in Burlington in April 1908.   The following year, the first school building was completed.   By 1913, it had 150 students and four teachers.  A two-story brick building was constructed in 1923.  In 1948 a new gymnasium was added.  In the 1960s, the schools of Burlington, Driftwood, Byron, and Amorita consolidated into a single school district, located in Burlington.  In 1963 a new school building was built. Many additions have been added since that time – the most recent being a band room and agriculture shop addition in 2014.  Also in 2014, there were approximately 150 (pre-K-12th) students.

Geography
Burlington lies along State Highway 8/11.

As of March, 2016, the cost of living index in Burlington was 78.5 (U.S. average is 100).

Demographics

As of the census of 2000, there were 156 people, 60 households, and 48 families residing in the town. The racial makeup of the town was 98.7% White, 0.6% African American, and 1.3% from two or more races.

Of the 60 households noted, 40.0% had children under the age of 18 living with them, 73.3% were married couples living together, 5.0% had a female householder with no husband present, and 20.0% were non-families. 20.0% of all households were made up of individuals, and 16.7% had someone living alone who was 65 years of age or older. The average household size was 2.60 and the average family size was 2.96.

In the town, the population was spread out, with 25.6% under the age of 18, 7.1% from 18 to 24, 25.0% from 25 to 44, 25.0% from 45 to 64, and 17.3% who were 65 years of age or older. The median age was 41.3 years. For every 100 females, there were 90.2 males. For every 100 females age 18 and over, there were 100.0 males.

The median income for a household in the town was $34,375, and the median income for a family was $34,844. Males had a median income of $28,125 versus $17,500 for females. The per capita income for the town was $17,234. None of the families and 1.2% of the population were living below the poverty line.

References

External links
 Encyclopedia of Oklahoma History and Culture - Burlington
 Burlington Cooperative Association
 The Vintage House

Towns in Alfalfa County, Oklahoma
Towns in Oklahoma